Lokananta is the first record label of Indonesia,  Based in Surakarta, Central Java, it was owned by the state-owned printing agency Percetakan Negara Republik Indonesia.

Lokananta has over 40,000 recordings, which include some 5,200 commercial labels, in its collection. About 20,000 recordings are without cover.

It currently has more than 5672 vinyl records of ethnic/folk music from all over Indonesia, and old Indonesian pop songs. Lokananta also has the biggest collection of keroncong and gamelan orchestras recordings (Javanese, Balinese, Sundanese, even Batak), together with the first recorded speeches of Indonesia's first president Sukarno and the original version of the national anthem.

History 
Lokananta was established on 29 October 1956 at Surakarta. In the beginning of its history, its primary function was that of offering a transcription service for RRI (Radio Republik Indonesia) radio network and manufacturing phonograph records and audio cassettes for broadcast by RRI stations throughout Indonesia; the master records were produced by the various RRI facilities and then sent to Surakarta for pressing.

The word Lokananta means "gamelan from heaven", was suggested by R. Maladi, the head of RRI at the time, and Surakarta was chosen because of its long history of radio broadcasting. Solosche Vereeniging (SRV) was the first Indonesian radio station that was established in 1933. Lokananta is also the name of the pitch-black gamelan set of Kraton Surakarta (Surakarta's Palace). It had the most modern equipments of its time, including the then state-of-the-art Trident Series 80B mixer, UREI 801 speaker.

Nowadays, after the bankrupt of 2001, Lokananta is trying to renovate its image, working on the recording of new musical genres and on the re-mastering of its impressive archive on physical supports like CDs, DVDs and WAV files: nineteen people still work here and Lokananta's main income is now the rental fee of some futsal space they were forced to create in the past three years.

During the controversy over the song Rasa Sayange between Indonesia and Malaysia, the 1962 record of the song from Lokananta proven that it was Indonesian song. The record of the Maluku's song was given to the 1962 Asian Games contingent (in the form of compilation Asian Games: Souvenir From Indonesia).

See also 
 National Press Monument

References 

  Lokananta Music: Catalog
  Rolling Stone Indonesia: Lokananta Saved Indonesian Music (May 2010)
  Lokananta Solo
  Tempo: Lokananta Will be Turned Into Music Museum
  Lokananta dan Monumen Pers
  The fate of Lokananta
 Lacking Government Support

Bibliography 
 Yampolsky, Philip; Lokananta: a discography of the National Recording Company of Indonesia, 1957-1985 Center for Southeast Asian Studies, University of Wisconsin, 1987

External links 
 Lokananta Records official Instagram account
 Studio Lokananta YouTube channel

Buildings and structures in Surakarta
Indonesian record labels
Indonesian music industry